The Arrow (previously known as Black Arrow) are a heavy metal band from Moscow, Russia. The band was founded in 1994 by Pavel Blischenko, the only member who has remained during the frequent line-up changes. The Arrow released a demo and three full-length albums: "Children of Gods", "Keeper of Souls" and "Lady Nite". The latter guested many famous vocalists: Hansi Kursch (Blind Guardian), Peter Wagner (Rage), Artur Berkut (Aria), Andrey Fedorenko (Archontes) and guitarist Sergey Mavrin (Mavrik). The band also recorded two cover-songs, "Dai Ruku Mnie" ("Give Me Your Hand", together with the band Roza Vetrov), which appeared on the Russian album "Tribute To Aria" and "Time What Is Time", included on the International Blind Guardian Tribute "Tales From the Underworld".

Members

Current members
 Pavel Blischenko - Keyboards
 Alexander "Snake" Tsvetkov - Bass
 Vladimir Aleshkin - drums

Former members
 Alex Cap - Vocals
 Andrey Khramov - Vocals
 Yury Bobyrev - Guitar
 Andrey Sedletsky - Guitars
 Sergey Knyazev - Guitars
 Kirill Emel'yanov - Guitars
 Dmitriy Mercalov - Bass
 Victor Astashov - Bass
 Valentin Dobrovol'skiy - Drums
 Alexey Bykov - Drums

Discography
 Flyin' High (1997, demo)	
 Tribute to Aria (2001, track "Dai Ruku Mnie", with Roza Vetrov)
 Tribute to Blind Guardian (2003, track "Time What Is Time")
 Children Of Gods (2001)
 Keeper Of Souls (2006)	
 Lady Nite	(2008)

References
 The Arrow official website
 interview with the band at Radio of Russia

External links
 
 The Arrow at CD-Maximum

Musical groups established in 1994
Russian heavy metal musical groups
1994 establishments in Russia